Pickled mustard is a popular dish in Hmong cuisine. In Laotian they are called pak ghat. The dish is traditionally made by putting fresh mustard greens into a container, typically a large pot, along with rice water, chillies, salt, and other spices if desired. The pot is then left usually at room temperature or in a sunny spot to ferment. After a few days, the pickled mustard is ready to eat. In modern practice, vinegar is sometimes added to the mixture to speed up the preparation of the dish.

References 

Hmong cuisine